Orthotylus quercicola is a species of bug from the Miridae family that can be found in European countries such as  Austria, Bosnia and Herzegovina, Bulgaria, Czech Republic, Greece, Hungary, Slovakia, and Slovenia.

References

Insects described in 1885
Hemiptera of Europe
quercicola